Acacia melvillei, commonly known as yarran, is a shrub of the genus Acacia and the subgenus Plurinerves that is endemic to south eastern Australia.

Description
Like most species of Acacia it has phyllodes rather than true leaves. The straight, flat and papery seed pods that form after flowering have more or less straight sides but are constricted between some seeds.

Taxonomy
The species was first formally described by the botanist Leslie Pedley in 1978 as a part of the work A revision of Acacia Mill. in Queensland, Part 1 as published in the journal Austrobaileya. Pedley reclassified it as Racosperma melvillei in 1987 but it returned to the Acacia genus in 2001.
The specific epithet honours Ronald Melville who was once a botanist at Kew Royal Botanic Gardens. The tree is similar in appearance to Acacia homalophylla and is thought to form hybrids with Acacia loderi.

Distribution
The range of the plant extends from around Clermont in south eastern Queensland in the north down to around Stanthorpe in the south east and throughout central New South Wales into the northern parts of Victoria as far south as Mildura and Kerang as a part of mixed open woodland communities growing in loam, clay and sandy soils.
It dominates the endangered Acacia melvillei shrubland in the Riverina and Murray-Darling Depression bioregions in New South Wales where it occurs in pure stands or along with less abundant tall shrubs or trees including Acacia loderi, Alectryon oleifolius, Casuarina pauper and Myoporum platycarpum''. The open canopy is followed by a scattered layer of mid-stratum shrubs then by a highly variable but sometimes sparse ground layer of grasses.

See also
List of Acacia species

References

melvillei
Flora of Queensland
Flora of New South Wales
Flora of Victoria (Australia)
Taxa named by Leslie Pedley
Plants described in 1978